Kyaikhtiyo Wildlife Sanctuary is a protected area in Myanmar stretching over . It was established in 2001 to conserve the biodiversity around the Kyaiktiyo Pagoda, a famous pilgrimage site in Mon State.

It is managed by the Nature and Wildlife Conservation Division.

Biodiversity
The Indo-Pacific gecko (Hemidactylus garnotii) occurs in the sanctuary.
In 2001, the bent-toed gecko Cyrtodactylus aequalis was discovered in the sanctuary and described as a new species in 2003.

Key wildlife species are leopard (Panthera pardus), serow (Capricornis milneedwardsiiare), red goral (Naemorhedus baileyi).
Sambar deer (Rusa unicolor), Indian muntjac (Muntiacus muntjak), gaur (Bos gaurus), wild boar (Sus scrofa) are also said to occur in the sanctuary.

Threats
Kyaikhtiyo Wildlife Sanctuary is threatened by illegal logging, harvesting of fire wood and hunting of wildlife for subsistence.

References

Protected areas of Myanmar
Protected areas established in 2001